Ana Vieira (Coimbra, 1940 – 29 February 2016) was a Portuguese artist.

Biography / Works

Ana Vieira was born in Coimbra, Portugal, in 1940. She grew up on São Miguel Island in the Azores, Portugal. She lived and worked in the Portuguese capital of Lisbon. 

Vieira died in Lisbon in 2016.

References

External links 
Artist Site
Centro de Arte Moderna, Fundação Calouste Gulbenkian, Lisboa – Ana Vieira
ANA VIEIRA NA COLECÇÃO DA FUNDAÇÃO DE SERRALVES

Portuguese artists
1940 births
2016 deaths
People from Coimbra